Kanwarpur (Village ID 170631) is a Village in Sultanpur District. According to the 2011 census it has a population of 546 living in 76 households.

References

Villages in Sultanpur district